Algeria–European Union relations are the foreign relations between the country of Algeria and the European Union.

History
Algeria was a member of the European Community during its incorporation with France and after its independence from France. Algeria was a member of the European Community until 1976 when a formal treaty excluded Algeria.

Trade
Algeria has been in an association agreement and a free trade agreement with the European Union since 2005.

In 2016, 67% of Algeria's exports went to the EU and 44% of Algeria's imports came from the EU.  Fuel and mining products made up 95.7% of EU imports from Algeria in 2017. Chemicals represented the second most important exported product, worth 2.9% of Algeria's exports to the EU.  The EU's main exports to Algeria are machinery (22.2%), transport equipment (13.4%), agricultural products (12.8%), chemicals (12.8%) and iron and steel (10.2%).

Funding and assistance
Algeria is receiving €108 million - €132 million under the European Neighbourhood Instrument. Currently funds are being used to promote economic efficiency, economic governance, and economic diversification, as well as strengthening democracy and reducing pollution.

Algeria is a member of the Euro-Mediterranean Partnership. Algeria also receives funding under the Development Cooperation Instrument (DCI), under programmes such as the European Instrument for Democracy and Human Rights. In total, these funds under the DCI were €5.5 million for 2015–2016.

The European Union is helping Algeria with its accession to the World Trade Organization, as well as holding informal talks on migration.

Chronology of relations with the EU

References

 
European Union
Foreign relations of Algeria
Economy of Algeria
Europe
Third-country relations of the European Union